Lieutenant George Clifton Peters (6 May 1894 –?) was a World War I flying ace credited with seven aerial victories.

References

Australian World War I flying aces
Year of death missing
1894 births
People from Adelaide
Recipients of the Distinguished Flying Cross (United Kingdom)